David Lees  (1881–1934) was a Scottish expert in public health and author of the authoritative work Diagnosis and Treatment of Venereal Disease.

Life

He was born in 1881, the son of Agnes Drennan and her husband, Robert Lees a vet from Lagg] in Ayrshire. He is thought to have been a cousin to Alexander Murray Drennan. He was educated at Ayr Academy. He studied medicine at the University of Edinburgh, graduating with an MB ChB around 1902. He then undertook a Diploma in Public Health at postgraduate level. On completion he began lecturing in venereal disease at the University. He also advised on venereal disease at the Edinburgh Royal Infirmary.

He lived at 35 Ferry Road in Leith, the harbour area of Edinburgh.

In the First World War he served as Regimental Medical Officer first to the Welsh Guards then to the Irish Guards. He served in France and saw action both at Ypres and Passchendaele. He received the Distinguished Service Order for his actions. He was also mentioned in dispatches.

After the war he joined Edinburgh Corporation as Clinical Medical Officer and ran various clinics relating to sexually transmitted diseases in the Old Town. In 1933 he was elected a Fellow of the Royal Society of Edinburgh. His proposers were Arthur Logan Turner, James Hartley Ashworth, Francis Albert Eley Crew and Richard Stanfield.

He died on 25 March 1934. He is buried in Grange Cemetery in south Edinburgh. The grave lies on the far west wall of the south-west extension.

Family
He was married to Effie Lawrie Brechin. He was the uncle of Robert Lees (1903-1980), with whom he wrote the textbook Diagnosis and Treatment of Venereal Disease.

Publications
Vaccine Therapy in Gonorrhoea (1920)
Keratoderma (1922)
Intolerance to Arsenobenzol and its Derivatives (1923)
Gonorrhoea Treatment (1924)
Diagnosis and Treatment of Venereal Disease (1927 and multiple reprints).

References

External links
publications

1881 births
1934 deaths
20th-century Scottish medical doctors
People from South Ayrshire
People educated at Ayr Academy
Alumni of the University of Edinburgh
Academics of the University of Edinburgh
Fellows of the Royal Society of Edinburgh
Scottish non-fiction writers
Welsh Guards officers
Irish Guards officers
British Army personnel of World War I